BATCH ENHANCER (or BE) (or BE.EXE,) is an applet or free-standing utility packaged with Norton Utilities (NU) to graphically enhance the presentation of batch files. Batch Enhancer allows the use of colours, square graphics, delays, beeps, more complex decision parameters, easier to create user-choice menus and other functions. 

BE is unusual in Norton's suite of utilities in that it was not designed to primarily be launched by NU itself, but be used like another (DOS) command/function to simplify the writing of executable batch files, or make them more powerful, such as for creating colourful and animated DOS screens that were typically plain blue & cyan.

Examples of usage syntaxes:     BE command (parameters)
          or
    BE filespec
Commands available:
      ASK   BEEP  BOX   CLS  DELAY  PRINTCHAR  ROWCOL
      SA    WINDOW

For more help on a specific command type:
      BE command ?

BE BEEP  [switches]
  or
BE BEEP  [filespec]

Switches
    /Dn  Duration of the tone in n/18 seconds
    /FnSound a tone of frequency n
    /Rn  Repeat the tone n times
    /Wn  Wait between tones n/18 seconds
PLAY A LITTLE TUNE.
be beep /F392 /D4;
be beep /F392 /D1;
be beep /F523 /D15;

BE BOX Usage:  BE BOX top left bottom right [color]

BE window 0,0,24,79 bright yellow on blue explode
BE window 4,11,20,68 bright yellow on green explode shadow

Usage:  BE DELAY ticks (1 tick = 1/18 second)

If the line "BE DELAY 18" was run from inside a batch file, it would pause for one second before moving to the next instruction. At modern computer speeds many batch files run too fast to be followed by a user; inserting a delay ensures that the user would see the DOS window that executes the .BAT file.

References

Software features
DOS software
Gen Digital software